Blue Stars/FIFA Youth Cup is an international association football competition organised by FIFA.

History
Founded by FC Blue Stars, Blue Stars/FIFA Youth Cup is an international youth club football tournament. The Zurich based club were one of the first to have a separate youth section. This youth section expanded to include a tournament involving the best youth teams in the world. Recognising its importance to youth football, FIFA took over the tournament in 1991.

The women's tournament started in 2018. Young Boys women team won the first edition.

Games are played in two 20-minute halves (25 for the final), only players between 18 and 20 years may participate. However, each team may have up to five players under the age of  18 feature. It is held on Ascension Thursday and the following day at the Buchlern sports stadium in Zurich.

Performance by club
Sources:

Men

Women

Total wins by country

References

External links
  

FIFA club competitions
Youth football competitions